This is a list of public art in South Australia organized by town. This list is focused only on outdoor public art, and thus does not encompass works contained within private collections, art galleries or museums.

Adelaide

Kapunda

Port Noarlunga

See also

 List of public art in Western Australia
 Australia's big things

References

Public art
South Australia
Public art
Public art